Zhang Xindan (born 3 August 1997) is a Chinese field hockey player who plays as a forward.

Career

Under–18
In 2014, Zhang Xindan was a member of the gold medal-winning Chinese U–18 team at the Youth Olympics in Nanjing.

National team
Zhang Xindan made her debut for the national team in 2017 at the Asian Cup in Kakamigahara, where she won a silver medal.

She has gone on to make a number of appearances for the national team. In 2021 she won a bronze medal at the Asian Champions Trophy in Donghae City. She most recently represented her country in season three of the FIH Pro League.

References

External links

1997 births
Living people
Female field hockey forwards
Chinese female field hockey players
Field hockey players at the 2014 Summer Youth Olympics